Kuyubaşı can refer to:

 Kuyubaşı, Batman
 Kuyubaşı, Bilecik
 Kuyubaşı, Bucak
 Kuyubaşı, Çamlıdere